4400 is a number. It may also refer to:

The 4400, a 2004 American science fiction television series
 4400 (TV series), a 2021 American science fiction mystery drama reboot of The 4400
4400, a year in the far future
4400 BC, a year during the 5th millennium BC